This is a list of stations in London Borough of Croydon. It includes all stations on the Network Rail Main Line Services that are open and Tramlink stops.

Stations

A

B

C

E

F

G

H

K

L

N

P

R

S

T

W

References

Croydon
Stations in Croydon